is a Japanese professional golfer.  Odate played on the Japan Golf Tour, and won twice.

Odate's sister, Masako Natsume, was a model and actress.

Professional wins (3)

Japan Golf Tour wins (2)

Japan Golf Tour playoff record (1–0)

Japan Challenge Tour wins (1)
1997 Nishino Cup in Central

External links

Japanese male golfers
Japan Golf Tour golfers
Sportspeople from Tokyo
1968 births
Living people